Lovitură de pedeapsă ("Penalty Kick") is the 11th studio album by Romanian rap group Paraziții.

Track listing

References

Paraziții albums
2016 albums